Old St Paul's may refer to:

United Kingdom
 Old St Paul's Cathedral in London, England, destroyed in 1666
 Old St. Paul's (novel), a novel by William Harrison Ainsworth set in the cathedral
 Old St. Paul's (film), a 1914 British silent historical film based on the novel
 Old Saint Paul's, Edinburgh, a Scottish Episcopal Church church in Scotland
 Old St Paul's Church, Hoddlesden, a former church in Lancashire, England

North America
 St. Paul's Episcopal Church (Baltimore, Maryland) or Old St. Paul's Church, an Episcopal church
 Old Saint Paul's Cemetery, the associated cemetery
 Old St. Paul's Methodist Episcopal Church, a former church in Odessa, Delaware

Oceania
 Old St. Paul's, Wellington, a former cathedral in New Zealand
 Old St Paul's Anglican Church, Deniliquin, a former church in New South Wales, Australia